Regina Barreca (born 1957) is an American academic and humorist. She is a Board of Trustees Distinguished Professor of English literature and feminist theory at the University of Connecticut and winner of UConn's highest award for excellence in teaching. She is the author of ten books, including the best selling They Used to Call Me Snow White But I Drifted: Women's Strategic Use of Humor (Viking/Humor) and editor of 13 others. Her work has appeared in The New York Times, The Independent of London, The Chronicle of Higher Education, Cosmopolitan, and The Harvard Business Review; for 20 years she wrote columns for various Tribune newspapers as well as a series of cover stories for the Chicago Tribune. She is a member of the New York Friar's Club and an honoree of the Connecticut Women's Hall of Fame.

Early life and education 
Barreca grew up in Brooklyn and Long Island, New York, and is of Italian descent. She was the first woman to be named Alumni Scholar at Dartmouth College, where she earned her 1979 bachelor's degree. Her stories from this time can be found in her memoir, Babes in Boyland: A Personal History of Co-education in the Ivy League.

She was a Reynolds Fellow and earned her 1981 M.A. at New Hall, Cambridge University, and earned her 1987 Ph.D. (English Literature) from the Graduate School, City University of New York, dissertation: “Hate and Humor in Women’s Literature: Twentieth-Century British Writers.”.

Career

Professor 
From 1981 to 1987, Barreca was a Graduate Assistant/Adjunct Lecturer at Queens College. In 1987 she became an Assistant Professor of English at the University of Connecticut, where she became an Associate Professor of English in 1991. From 1997 on she has been Professor of English. She has also been a Reed Fellow for English Language and Literature at UConn since 2017.  As of 2018, she has received the American Association of University Professors Excellence in Research and Creativity: Career Award, and was named the Board of Trustees Distinguished Professor of English Literature.

Author

Articles and other publications 
She is currently a blogger for Psychology Today, where she has over 7.5 million views.

Barreca has also published articles in The New York Times, The Philadelphia Inquirer, The Atlanta Journal-Constitution, the Chicago Tribune, Harvard Business Review, The Dartmouth Alumni Magazine, The Orlando Sentinel, Ms. magazine, The Common Review, The Chronicle of Higher Education, and Cosmopolitan and elsewhere. Barreca's books have been translated into Chinese, German, Spanish, Japanese and Portuguese.

Her poem, "Nighttime Fires," first published in the Minnesota Review, is widely anthologized and regularly taught.

Barreca cowrote a series of humor columns in The Washington Post with Gene Weingarten about the differences between men and women. These became the basis of the book she wrote with Weingarten, I'm with Stupid: One Man. One Woman. 10,000 Years of Misunderstanding Between the Sexes Cleared Right Up. They worked for two years via email and on the phone without having met first.

Barreca appeared in Milton Friedman's documentary Free to Choose - Episode 6, as a student for Dartmouth College.

Books 
In 2011, Barreca published a memoir about being one of the first classes of women at Dartmouth College titled Babes in Boyland: A Personal History of Co-education in the Ivy League.

In 2021, she partnered with Woodhall Press to originate the "Fast Women" series and published "Fast Funny Women: 75 Essays of Flash Nonfiction", which she edited. In 2022, "Fast Fierce Women" was released. "Fast Fallen Women" will appear in 2023.

Speaker 
A noted public speaker, Barreca lectures nationally and internationally about a variety of topics including humor, women's comedy, women's lives, everybody's stress, and gender issues in the workplace. She has served as an advisor to the Library of Congress for work on humor and the American character, and was deemed a "feminist humor maven" by Ms. magazine.

She has appeared on dozens of radio and television programs including The Oprah Winfrey Show, 20/20, 48 Hours, The Joy Behar Show, Dr. Phil, and The Today Show.

Personal 
Barreca married her husband, Michael Meyer, in 1991. They live in Storrs, Connecticut.

Works and publications

Books written 
 "If You Lean In, Will Men Just Look Down Your Blouse?" (2016), 
 It's Not That I'm Bitter, or How I Learned to Stop Worrying About Visible Panty Lines and Conquered the World (2009), 
 Babes in Boyland: A Personal History of Co-education in the Ivy League (2005), 
 I'm with Stupid (2004), co-written with Gene Weingarten
 An ABC of Vice: An Insatiable Woman's Guide (2003), illustrated by Nicole Hollander
 Too Much of a Good Thing is Wonderful (2000), 
 Sweet Revenge: The Wicked Delights of Getting Even (1995), 
 Untamed and Unabashed: Essays on Women and Humor in British Literature (1994), 
 Perfect Husbands (and Other Fairy Tales) (1993), 
 They Used to Call Me Snow White…But I Drifted: Women's Strategic Use of Humor (1991),

Books edited 
 Fast Fierce Women (2022), 
 Fast Funny Women (2021), 
 Make Mine A Double: Why Women Like Us Like to Drink (or Not) (2011), 
 The Signet Book of American Humor (2004), 
 Don't Tell Mama: The Penguin Book of Italian American Writing (2002), 
 A Sit-down with the Sopranos: Watching Italian American Culture on TV's Most Talked About Series (2002), 
 The Erotics of Instruction (1997), 
 The Penguin Book of Women's Humor (1996), 
 Desire and Imagination: 20 Classic Essays in Sexuality (1995), 
 Fay Weldon's Wicked Fictions (1994)
 New Perspectives on Women and Comedy (1992), 
 Sex and Death in Victorian Literature (1990), 
 Last Laughs (1988)

Books introduced 
 Dorothy Parker. Complete Stories Colleen Bresse (Editor), Regina Barreca (Introduction) 
 Louisa May. Little Women Regina Barreca (Introduction), Susan Straight (Afterword)

Honorary degrees and awards 

She has received a number of honorary degrees. In 2000, she received an honorary degree from Shepard's College in West Virginia. She received an honorary degree from Manchester Community College in 2014, and honorary Doctorate of Human Letters, Charter Oak State College, Connecticut in 2016.

References

External links 
 
 Gina Barreca at The University of Connecticut

Living people
Radical feminists
University of Connecticut faculty
American academics of English literature
American humorists
1957 births
People from Storrs, Connecticut
American writers of Italian descent
Writers from Brooklyn
University of Cambridge in fiction
Women humorists
Penguin Books people
American memoirists
American women memoirists
Comedians from New York (state)
Hartford Courant people
Gender studies academics
Dartmouth College alumni
Alumni of Murray Edwards College, Cambridge
People from Long Island